Bakero (born 2 April 1978 in Portugal) is a Portuguese retired footballer.

References

1978 births
Living people
Portuguese footballers
Association football wingers
Association football midfielders
F.C. Felgueiras players
U.D. Leiria players
C.S. Marítimo players
S.C. Braga players
S.C. Salgueiros players
GD Bragança players
F.C. Maia players
Clube Caçadores das Taipas players
F.C. Penafiel players
Nea Salamis Famagusta FC players
F.C. Vizela players
S.C. Espinho players
A.D. Lousada players
F.C. Felgueiras 1932 players
Portuguese expatriate footballers
Expatriate footballers in Spain
Portuguese expatriate sportspeople in Spain
Expatriate footballers in Cyprus
Portuguese expatriate sportspeople in Cyprus